The  was an infantry division of the Imperial Japanese Army. It was formed 28 February 1945 in Seoul as a square division. It was a part of the 16 simultaneously created divisions batch numbering from 140th to 160th.

Action
From May 1945, the 150th division was tasked with the coastal defense of the North Jeolla Province and South Jeolla Province, with garrisons in Jeongeup (headquarters and barrage artillery), and 431st infantry regiment on Daejeon-ri island, and Jangseong County (429th infantry regiment and automatic cannon company). Also, the 430th, 432nd infantry regiments and the rest of units were deployed at Mokpo. After the Soviet invasion of Manchuria the division was ordered to move and by the time of surrender of Japan 15 August 1945 was in Gunsan.

See also
 List of Japanese Infantry Divisions

Notes and references
This article incorporates material from Japanese Wikipedia page 第150師団 (日本軍), accessed 13 July 2016
 Madej, W. Victor, Japanese Armed Forces Order of Battle, 1937–1945 [2 vols], Allentown, PA: 1981.

Japanese World War II divisions
Infantry divisions of Japan
Military units and formations established in 1945
Military units and formations disestablished in 1945
1945 establishments in Japan
1945 disestablishments in Japan